Schinia felicitata is a moth of the family Noctuidae. It is found from northern Mexico, north to southern California and southwest Utah.

The wingspan is 27–28 mm.

The larvae feed on Oenothera deltoides.

External links
Images
Butterflies and Moths of North America

Schinia
Moths of North America
Moths described in 1894